Tiryancha(तिर्यंच) is the term used for plants and animals (including insects) in Jain philosophy.

Notes

References
 

Jain philosophy